Andrew Joseph Finch (born March 20, 1981) is an American snowboarder. His accomplishments include winning the overall U.S. Grand Prix Halfpipe Title in 2003 and 2004, taking first place in the Arctic Challenge in Norway in April 2004, winning the Vans Triple Crown in February 2004, winning the O'Neill Snowboard Jam in January 2005, and finishing in second place in Northstar Resort's Vans Tahoe Cup. In addition, Finch competed in the 2006 Winter Olympics for the United States. He lives in Truckee, California and attended Bullard High School in Fresno, California.

Finch and his friend Tommy Czeschin participated on the 19th season of The Amazing Race. They ended up in 4th place out of 11 teams and were the eighth team eliminated in Casco Viejo, Panama. He and Tommy are one of the few teams who won 6 out of 12 legs on The Amazing Race 19.

References

External links
 
 Andy and Tommy's The Amazing Race 19 Official Profile

1981 births
Living people
American male snowboarders
Sportspeople from Fresno, California
People from Truckee, California
Snowboarders at the 2006 Winter Olympics
The Amazing Race (American TV series) contestants
X Games athletes
20th-century American people
21st-century American people